3 is the fourth studio album by U.S. punk-folk band Violent Femmes, released in early 1989. The songs were performed by the three members of the band playing only drums, bass and guitar, with the addition of keyboards and saxophone.

Critical reception
Trouser Press wrote that "Gano’s songwriting and delivery have their usual odd character and some of the old passion, but the Femmes don’t seem to be making much progress or impact in any direction here." Chris Woodstra of AllMusic noted that the fans of the band's early days would "appreciate the slightly stripped-back acoustic production." The Los Angeles Times wrote that "3 often comes off as a pale, precious shadow of the Femmes’ 1983 debut album." The Rolling Stone Album Guide deemed the album "a jumbled stylistic grab bag."

Track listing

Personnel
 Gordon Gano – guitar, vocals
 Brian Ritchie – bass guitar
 Victor DeLorenzo – drums
 Sigmund Snopek III – keyboards
 Peter Balestrieri - baritone saxophone
 Warren A. Bruleigh – Co-Producer, Engineer
 Matt Lane – Assistant Engineer, Carriage House
 Bill Smith – Assistant Engineer, Home Base
 Bernie Grundman – Mastering
 © 1988 Slash Records ℗ 1988 Slash Records, P.O. Box 48888, Los Angeles, CA 90048. Manufactured and distributed by Warner Bros. Records Inc., a    Warner Communications Company. 
Recorded at the Carriage House, Stamford, CT, except track 12 recorded at Home Base, NYC. 
All songs © 1988 Gorno Music ASCAP

Charts

References

Violent Femmes albums
1988 albums
Slash Records albums